Velafrons (meaning "sailed forehead") is a genus of lambeosaurine hadrosaurid dinosaur from the Late Cretaceous of Mexico.  It is known from a mostly complete skull and partial skeleton of a juvenile individual, with a bony crest  on the forehead. Its fossils were found in the late Campanian-age Cerro del Pueblo Formation (about 72 million years old), near Rincon Colorado, Coahuila, Mexico.  The type specimen is CPC-59, and the type species is V. coahuilensis.

Description 

Velafrons was most similar to young specimens of Corythosaurus and Hypacrosaurus, and was found to be a corythosaurin in the phylogenetic analysis performed by Gates and colleagues in their description of the genus.  The skull was large in comparison to skulls from other genera at a similar growth stage, so the crest may have been small in adults or followed a different growth pattern, or it may be that adult Velafrons were also larger than adults of other lambeosaurine genera.  Unusually large size is also seen in the Mexican hadrosaurids Kritosaurus sp. and Magnapaulia laticaudus. As a hadrosaurid, Velafrons would have been a herbivore. The animal is known from several disarticulated remains, those being certain cervical vertebrae and a disarticulated skull.

See also 
 Timeline of hadrosaur research

References 

Lambeosaurines
Campanian genus first appearances
Campanian genus extinctions
Late Cretaceous dinosaurs of North America
Cretaceous Mexico
Fossils of Mexico
Fossil taxa described in 2007
Taxa named by Scott D. Sampson
Taxa named by Lindsay Zanno
Ornithischian genera